Cavaglià is a comune (municipality) in the Province of Biella in the Italian region Piedmont, located about  northeast of Turin and about  south of Biella.

Cavaglià borders the following municipalities: Alice Castello, Carisio, Dorzano, Roppolo, Salussola, Santhià. Sights include a castle, the Baroque church of St. Michael Archangel, the neo-Renaissance church of Santa Maria di Babilone, and an archaeological site with menhirs from as early as the Iron Age.

Twin towns — sister cities
Cavaglià is twinned with:

  Montbazin, France (2013)

References

External links
Official website

Cities and towns in Piedmont